Jolliff Spring Branch is a stream in western Oregon County the Ozarks of southern Missouri. The stream is a tributary to Barren Fork.

The source area lies northeast of Rover and becomes perennial after receiving the flow from the Jolliff Spring. The stream flows northeast roughly parallel to U.S. Route 160 and joins Barren Fork south of Thomasville.

Jolliff Spring Branch has the name of Randall C. Joliff, a pioneer citizen.

See also
List of rivers of Missouri

References

Rivers of Oregon County, Missouri
Rivers of Missouri